Otto J. Kolar (December 6, 1911 – April 10, 1995) was an American professional basketball player. He played for the Sheboygan Red Skins and Chicago Bruins in the National Basketball League and averaged 5.1 points per game.

He was the brother of Eddie Kolar, who played alongside him for the Red Skins in one game during the 1938–39 season.

References

1911 births
1995 deaths
American men's basketball players
Basketball players from Chicago
Chicago Bruins players
Forwards (basketball)
Guards (basketball)
People from Cicero, Illinois
Sheboygan Red Skins players